James Osborne (24 September 1845 – 11 April 1877) was an Australian politician.

He was born at Marshall Mount near Wollongong to Henry Osborne and Sarah Marshall. He was a pastoralist on the Murrumbidgee River before entering politics. In 1869 he was elected to the New South Wales Legislative Assembly for Illawarra, a seat his brother Patrick had already represented from 1864 to 1866. Their father had been a member of New South Wales Legislative Council (1851-1856) and Legislative Assembly (1856-57).

James Osborne retired in 1872, and died in Sydney in 1877.

References

 

1845 births
1877 deaths
Members of the New South Wales Legislative Assembly
19th-century Australian politicians